Alcino Martino de Barros Pinto (1955/56 – 19 November 2020) was a São Toméan politician. He was President of the National Assembly of São Tomé and Príncipe from November 28, 2012 to November 22, 2014.  He succeeded Evaristo Carvalho who was a provisional president and was succeeded by José da Graca Diogo.

References

1950s births
2020 deaths
Government ministers of São Tomé and Príncipe
Year of birth missing
Place of birth missing